The Buchanan Lake Formation is a geologic formation on Axel Heiberg Island in Nunavut, and part of the Eureka Sound Group. The formation is divided into four members and preserves fossils dating back to the Lutetian stage.

See also

 List of fossiliferous stratigraphic units in Nunavut

References
 

Paleogene Nunavut
Buchanan Lake Formation